Abaza is an Egyptian animated television series that aired for one season in 2014. Abaza is set in a fictitious world where humans and monsters live next to each other in harmony. The monsters in Abaza are not evil and are portrayed in a caricatured manner.

Plot 
The series follows the adventures of protagonist Abaza and his friends. Abaza is a lovable but lazy monster who experiences a change in his life when a beautiful girl enters his world, and he must prove himself in order to win her heart. He then embarks on an adventure to be the greatest inventor in the world, during which he makes quite a lot of inventions, some of them work and others do not.

Characters
 Abaza (voiced by Maged El Kedwany) is a lovable monster,  most of his neighbors and friends love him, although he sometimes acts childishly, they always forgive him because he’s a kind monster. He always does his parties and fun shenanigans which they always enjoy. Abaza’s main job is to invent things, he makes machines to make his life easier, or at least that’s the plan, most of the time his inventions leads him into funny adventures. he looks at his main neighbor Dosa as his mother, he loves her as she always guides him, but most of the time she gives him tough love. Their relation is one of an odd couple, they love each other but have a difficult time expressing that love to each other.
 Dosa (voiced by Sawsan Badr) took a special interest in Abaza since he came to live in the building, treating him like her own child, she knew that he’s a boy in heart and she decided to parent him. she tries to reform him and undo the mistakes he does. but sometimes he angers her too much that she decides to teach him a lesson, and although she is an old lady, she believes that it’s the heart that matters not age, she does not fear adventure and always ready to try new things.
 Hany (voiced by Mostafa Shawkat) is the doorman of the building that Abaza lives in. He watches over the building and does the tenants' bidding. He's not just the doorman and has developed a friendly relationship with most of the tenants. He's one of Abaza's best friends. Oftentimes, Abaza tries his crazy inventions on him, as part of his friendship duty to Abaza. Of course, not all those inventions work as they're supposed to. He hails from the Nuba in upper Egypt, and he's very proud of his origins.
 Wahdan (voiced by Lotfy Labeeb)
 Abdulsamad 
 Zaghlool

Controversy
In 2014 the Egyptian Abaza family threatened to sue Sada Elbalad TV for the creation of this program.

See also
 List of Egyptian television series

References

2010s Egyptian television series
Egyptian drama television series